Attention! is the third studio album by German singer Alexander Klaws. It was released by Sony BMG on Hansa Records on 10 March 2006 in German-speaking Europe. Recorded after a short-living hiatus, it marked a departure from Klaws' previous work with Deutschland sucht den Superstar judge and musical mentor Dieter Bohlen, who gained no credit on the record. Instead, the album features a wider range of producers, including Terri Bjerre, David Stenmarck, Sandi Strmljan, Thorsten Brötzmann, Ivo Moring, and Mirko von Schlieffen.

The album reached the top twenty of the album charts in Austria and Germany, becoming the singer's lowest–charting album then following the number-one success of his previous albums Take Your Chance (2003) and Here I Am (2004). Attention! spawned two singles, "All (I Ever Want)", the theme song to the musical The Three Musketeers, featuring vocals by German singer Sabrina Weckerlin and leading single "Not like You".

Track listing

Charts

References

2006 albums
Alexander Klaws albums
Sony BMG albums
Hansa Records albums